Valery Noufor (born May 13, 1985, in Douala) is a professional Cameroonian  footballer currently playing for Espérance Guider.

External links
Profile and Pictures – www.cotonsport.com

1985 births
Living people
Cameroonian footballers
Coton Sport FC de Garoua players
Kadji Sports Academy players
Association football midfielders